West Wabash Historic District is a national historic district located at Wabash, Wabash County, Indiana. It encompasses 283 contributing buildings in a predominantly residential section of Wabash.  It developed between about 1840 and 1930, and includes representative examples of Federal, Italianate, Romanesque Revival, and Colonial Revival style architecture.  Located in the district is the separately listed First Christian Church.  Other notable buildings include the Jackson Family House (c. 1850), John and Lucinda Sivey House (late 1850s), Thomas and Hannah Whiteside House (1881), Matlock-Barnhart House (1866–1867), Alexander and Millicent Hill House (1892, by Wing & Mahurin), David and Sadie Cohen House (1909), Bennett E. Davis House (1842), Presbyterian Church (1881), Wabash Carnegie Public Library (1903, by Wing & Mahurin), and Wabash High School (1894, by Wing & Mahurin).

It was listed on the National Register of Historic Places in 1988.

References

Historic districts on the National Register of Historic Places in Indiana
Italianate architecture in Indiana
Romanesque Revival architecture in Indiana
Colonial Revival architecture in Indiana
Federal architecture in Indiana
Historic districts in Wabash, Indiana
National Register of Historic Places in Wabash County, Indiana